The Space Needle is an observation tower in Seattle, Washington, United States. Considered to be an icon of the city, it has been designated a Seattle landmark. Located in the Lower Queen Anne neighborhood, it was built in the Seattle Center for the 1962 World's Fair, which drew over 2.3 million visitors.

Visitors can reach the top of the Space Needle by elevators, which take 41 seconds. On April 19, 1999, the city's Landmarks Preservation Board designated the tower a historic landmark.

Architecture

The architecture of the Space Needle is the result of a compromise between the designs of two people, Edward E. Carlson and John Graham, Jr. The two leading ideas for the World Fair involved businessman Edward E. Carlson's sketch (on a napkin) of a giant balloon tethered to the ground (the gently sloping base) and architect John Graham's concept of a flying saucer (the halo that houses the restaurant and observation deck). Victor Steinbrueck introduced the hourglass profile of the tower. The 6.8  Nisqually earthquake jolted the Needle enough in 2001 for water to slosh out of the toilets in the restrooms. The Space Needle will not sustain serious structural damage during earthquakes of magnitudes below 9.1.

These were closed in 2000 to make way for SkyCity, a larger restaurant that features Pacific Northwest cuisine. In 1993, the elevators were replaced with new computerized versions.

On December 31, 1999, a powerful beam of light was unveiled for the first time. Called the Legacy Light or Skybeam, it is powered by lamps that total 85 million candela shining skyward from the top of the Space Needle to honor national holidays and special occasions in Seattle. The concept of this beam was derived from the official 1962 World's Fair poster, which depicted such a light source although none was incorporated into the original design. It is somewhat controversial because of the light pollution it creates. Originally planned to be turned on 75 nights per year, it has generally been used fewer than a dozen times per year. It did remain lit for eleven days in a row from September 11, 2001, to September 22, 2001, in response to the September 11, 2001, attacks.

A 1962 Seattle World's Fair poster showed a grand spiral entryway leading to the elevator that was ultimately omitted from final building plans. The main stairwell has 848 steps from the basement to the top of the observation deck.
Unlike many other similar structures, such as the CN Tower in Toronto, the Space Needle is not used for broadcasting purposes.

History

Construction

Edward E. Carlson, chairman of the 1962 World's Fair in Seattle, had an idea for erecting a tower with a restaurant at the World's Fair. Carlson was president of a hotel company and was not recognized in art or design, but he was inspired by a recent visit to the Stuttgart Tower of Germany. Local architect John Graham soon became involved as a result of his success in designing Northgate Mall. Graham's first move was to alter the restaurant's original design to a revolving restaurant, similar to his previous design of the La Ronde tower restaurant at the Ala Moana Shopping Center in Hawaii.

The proposed Space Needle had no pre-selected site. Since it was not financed by the city, land had to be purchased within the fairgrounds. The investors had been unable to find suitable land and the search for a site was nearly dead when, in 1961, they discovered a lot, containing switching equipment for the fire and police alarm systems. The land, which originally had the neighborhood's fire station until 1921, was sold by the city for $75,000. At this point, only one year remained before the World's Fair would begin. The Needle was privately financed and built by the Pentagram Corporation, consisting of Bagley Wright, contractor Howard S. Wright, architect John Graham, Ned Skinner, and Norton Clapp. In 1977 Bagley, Skinner and Clapp sold their interest to Howard Wright who now controls it under the name of Space Needle Corporation.

The foundation weighs  (including  of reinforcing steel), the same as the above-ground structure.

With time an issue, the construction team worked around the clock. The domed top, housing the top five levels (including the restaurants and observation deck), was perfectly balanced so that the restaurant could rotate with the help of one tiny electric motor, originally , later replaced with a  motor. With paint colors named Orbital Olive for the body, Astronaut White for the legs, Re-entry Red for the saucer, and Galaxy Gold for the roof, the Space Needle was finished in less than one year. It was completed in April 1962 at a cost of $4.5 million. The last elevator car was installed the day before the Fair opened on April 21. During the course of the Fair nearly 20,000 people a day rode the elevators to the Observation Deck. Upon completion, the Space Needle was the tallest building in the western United States, replacing the Smith Tower in downtown Seattle as the tallest building west of the Mississippi since 1914.

The revolving restaurant was operated by Western International Hotels, of which Carlson was President, under a 20-year contract from April 1, 1962, to April 1, 1982.

Carillon
An imitation carillon (using recordings of bells, rather than live bells) was installed in the Space Needle, and played several times a day during the World's Fair. The instrument, built by the Schulmerich Bells Company of Hatfield, Pennsylvania under the name "Carillon Americana", recreated the sounds of 538 bells and was the largest in the world, until eclipsed by a 732 bell instrument at the 1964 New York World's Fair. The operator's console was located in the base of the Space Needle, completely enclosed in glass to allow observation of the musician playing the instrument. It was also capable of being played from a roll, like a player piano. The carillon was disassembled after the fair's close.

The Carillon Americana was featured on a 12-track LP record called "Bells On High-Fi" (catalog number AR-8, produced by Americana Records, of Sellersville, Pennsylvania). These studio recordings were performed by noted carillonneur John Klein (1915-1981).

After the Fair

A radio broadcast studio was built on the observation level of the Space Needle in 1963. It was used for morning broadcasts by Radio KING and its sister TV station KING-TV from July 1963 to May 1966, and KIRO Radio from 1966 to 1974. Disc jockey Bobby Wooten of country music station KAYO-AM lived in an apartment built adjacent to the Space Needle's broadcast studio for six months in 1974, which required a permit variance from the city government.

On March 27, 1964, the restaurant atop the Space Needle stopped rotating as a result of the 9.2 earthquake in Alaska.

In 1974, author Stephen Cosgrove's children's book Wheedle on the Needle imagined a furry creature called the Wheedle who lived on top of the Space Needle and caused its light to flash. Its closing quatrain is: There's a Wheedle on the Needle / I know just what you're thinking / But if you look up late at night / You'll see his red nose blinking. The Wheedle has since become a fixture of Seattle. It became the mascot of the Seattle SuperSonics National Basketball Association (NBA) franchise, who played in nearby KeyArena (now Climate Pledge Arena). The SuperSonics moved to Oklahoma City on July 3, 2008.

While this level had been part of the original plans for the Space Needle, it was not built until this time. Today, the SkyLine Banquet Facility can accommodate groups of 20–360 people.

Renovations were completed in 2000 at a cost ($21 million) approximately the same in inflated dollars as the original construction price. Renovations between 1999 and 2000 included the SkyCity restaurant, SpaceBase retail store, Skybeam installation, Observation Deck overhaul, lighting additions and repainting.

On New Year's Eve, the Space Needle hosts a fireworks show at midnight; Alberto Navarro, a fireworks artist from Bellevue, is the lead architect of the show, which is viewed by thousands from the Seattle Center grounds, and televised by KING-TV. In 2000, public celebrations were canceled because of perceived terror threats against the structure after investigations into the foiled millennium bombing plots, but the fireworks show was still held. The 2020 fireworks display was canceled and replaced by a light show due to high winds, while the 2021 display was canceled and replaced by a broadcast-only augmented reality show due to the COVID-19 pandemic. The fireworks display returned for 2022, but the Seattle Center grounds were closed to the public due to state proof of vaccination rules, and the television broadcast included augmented reality effects.

In 2002, a real estate consultant in Bellevue proposed the construction of five smaller replicas of the Space Needle around the city to promote tourism, though official plans to build the proposed structures have not yet materialized.

On May 19, 2007, the Space Needle welcomed its 45 millionth visitor, Greg Novoa from California, who received a free trip for two to Paris.

In May 2008, the Space Needle received its first professional deep cleaning since the opening of the 1962 World's Fair. The cleaning was only done at night so that the Space Needle could stay open to the public. No detergents were used in consideration of the Seattle Center and the nearby Experience Music Project. 

As part of the celebration of its 50th anniversary in April 2012, the Needle was painted "Galaxy Gold", which is more of an orangish color in practice. This is the same color used when the needle was originally constructed for the 1962 World's Fair. This temporary makeover, intended to last through the summer, is not the Needle's first: it had the University of Washington (UW) Huskies football team logo painted after the team won the 1992 Rose Bowl. When the game show Wheel of Fortune taped episodes in Seattle in 1995, it was painted to resemble the titular wheel as part of an intro sequence with Vanna White, It was painted crimson after Washington State won the Apple Cup,  was painted red, white, and blue for Memorial Day in 2003, and has been seen with the Seattle SuperSonics and Seattle Mariners colors and logos.

A renovation of the top of the Space Needle began in the summer of 2017, to add an all-glass floor to the restaurant, and replace the observation platform windows with floor-to-ceiling glass panels to more closely match the 1962 original concept sketches, as well as upgrades and updates to the internal systems.  Called the Century Project, the work was scheduled to finish by June 2018, at a cost of $100 million in private funds provided by the Wright family, who own the Space Needle. The designer is Olson Kundig Architects and the general contractor is Hoffman Construction Company. The rotating restaurant's motor was replaced, the elevator capacity was increased by adding elevators, or double-stacking them, and the energy efficiency of the building was improved with the aim of achieving LEED Gold Certification. The temporary scaffold's ,  platform under the top structure was assembled on the ground, and then lifted by cables  from the ground to the underside of the structure, controlled by 12 operators standing on the platform as it was raised. The platform was made by Safway Services, a company specializing in unique construction scaffolding. One-sixth of the observation deck was closed at a time, so that the Space Needle was never completely shut down to the public.

The space reopened in August 2018 as the Loupe, an indoor observation deck with a revolving glass floor. It takes 45 minutes for the observation deck to do a full rotation. Two sets of stairs called the Oculus Stairs were added to connect the two new additional levels. They were named after the glass oculus at the base of the stairs where the Space Needle elevators can be seen ascending and descending. A café, wine bar, more restrooms, and an additional accessibility elevator to the top observation deck were also added.

Jumping incidents
Six parachutists have leaped from the tower since its opening, in a sport known as BASE jumping. This activity is legal only with prior authorization. Four of them were part of an authorized promotion in 1996, and one of the jumpers got injured and broke a bone in her back while attempting the stunt. The other two jumped illegally and were arrested.

Paul D. Baker was the first person to jump from the Space Needle, committing suicide on March 4, 1974. Mary Lucille Wolf also jumped from the tower that year, on May 25. Following the two 1974 suicides, netting beneath and improved fencing around the observation deck were installed. In spite of the barrier additions, however, another suicide by Dixie Reeder occurred on July 5, 1978.

Appearances in TV and film

As a symbol of the Pacific Northwest, the Space Needle has made numerous appearances in films, TV shows, and other works of fiction. The Space Needle is often used in establishing shots as an economical means to tell the audience the setting is Seattle.  Examples include the TV shows Frasier, Grey's Anatomy, Dark Angel, Bill Nye the Science Guy,  and films It Happened at the World's Fair (1962) and The Parallax View (1974) where it was used as a filming location, and Sleepless in Seattle (1993), Chronicle (2012). In the 1999 film Austin Powers: The Spy Who Shagged Me made an absurdist visual gag conflating another icon of Seattle, Starbucks, with the tower, showing the coffee chains's name written across the Space Needle's saucer placing the villain Doctor Evil's base of operations there after his henchman Number 2 shifted the organization's resources toward the coffee company. As a visual symbol of Seattle, the Space Needle has been incorporated into the logos of NBA, WNBA, MLS, and NHL professional sports teams.

The Space Needle has been involved in practical jokes, especially those on April Fools' Day. In 1989, KING-TV's Almost Live! reported that the Space Needle had collapsed, causing panicked people to call emergency services and forcing the station to apologize afterwards; the incident was compared to the 1938 radio broadcast of The War of the Worlds, which caused panic among some listeners. In 2015, public radio station KPLU 88.5 FM reported in the news story "Proposed Development To 'Assimilate' Seattle's Landmark Space Needle?" that a permit application (Notice of Proposed Land Use Action) had been submitted "to construct a 666 unit cube to assimilate" the landmark.

Other TV appearances include The History Channel's Life After People, in which the tower collapses after 200 years because of corrosion. The tower was also destroyed in the TV miniseries 10.5 when a 7.9 earthquake hits Seattle. The miniseries mistakenly portrays the Needle as crumbling concrete, though the structure is actually made of steel and designed to withstand up to a 9.0 earthquake.

Gallery

See also 
 Näsinneula, a similar-look tower in Tampere, Finland
 Sydney Tower, a similar-look tower in Sydney, Australia
 List of tallest buildings in Seattle
 List of towers

References

Further reading
Lost and Found Films: Building the Space Needle, 1961

External links

 
 Century 21 Exposition design plans for the 1962 Seattle World's Fair – Architecture of the Pacific Northwest Database from the University of Washington
 Entry at site of Howard S. Wright Construction Co.
 Video of scaffold platform lifted 500 feet at night: 

Towers completed in 1961
Googie architecture
Buildings and structures in Seattle
Towers with revolving restaurants
Landmarks in Seattle
Seattle Center
Observation towers in the United States
Towers in Washington (state)
Tourist attractions in Seattle
World's fair architecture in Seattle
Century 21 Exposition
Symbols of Washington (state)
1961 establishments in Washington (state)